Wang Qingzhi (born 29 September 1968) is a Chinese cyclist. She competed in the women's pursuit at the 1996 Summer Olympics.

References

External links
 

1968 births
Living people
Chinese female cyclists
Olympic cyclists of China
Cyclists at the 1996 Summer Olympics
Place of birth missing (living people)
Cyclists at the 1994 Asian Games
Cyclists at the 1998 Asian Games
Asian Games medalists in cycling
Medalists at the 1994 Asian Games
Medalists at the 1998 Asian Games
Asian Games gold medalists for China
20th-century Chinese women